Bruce Philip Dohrenwend (born July 26, 1927) is an American psychiatric epidemiologist. He is Professor of Social Science in Columbia University's Department of Psychiatry and Professor of Epidemiology in the University's Mailman School of Public Health. He received his PhD from Cornell University in 1955, and served as president of the American Psychopathological Association in 1994. He was married to Barbara Snell Dohrenwend prior to her death in 1982. The two of them frequently collaborated on research projects, and they co-authored or co-edited a total of four books together. In 1980, both Dohrenwends were honored with the Award for Distinguished Contributions to Community Psychology and Community Mental Health from division 27 of the American Psychological Association, the Society for Community Research and Action. He is known for his research on the prevalence and predictors of post-traumatic stress disorder among veterans of the Vietnam War.

References

1927 births
Living people
Columbia University Mailman School of Public Health faculty
Cornell University alumni
American psychiatrists
American epidemiologists